Shanxi Experimental Secondary School (SESS) (Chinese: 山西省实验中学) is a public, co-educational day school in Taiyuan, Shanxi province. Founded as Ling Detang School in 1883 by Zhang Zhidong in response to manage severe corruption in Shanxi Province. SESS is the only official key middle school in Shanxi Province, directly administrated by Shanxi Department of Education.

The currently (until 2015) campus area of SESS is about 153,300 m2 (37.88-acre), containing two parts of campuses that located in both northern Taiyuan and southern Taiyuan. The northern part of campus (33,000 m2  or 8.15-acre) is served as middle school, while the southern part of campus (120000 m2) is majorly served as high school.

Until 2014, the total number of students in SESS is about 4,500; the number of teachers, managers and workers is about 300.

History
School and campuses history

Ling Detang School was founded in 1883 by Zhang Zhidong, who was the Xunfu (Grand coordinator and provincial governor) of Shanxi Province. At that time, Shanxi was undergoing serious corruption of local governors. Zhang initiated the school in order to create a better educational circumstance to people.

In 1952 (after the winning of the Chinese Civil War by Communist Party of China) the Ling Detang School was renamed to Girls' High School of Taiyuan by Taiyuan government.

In 1955, the Girls' High School of Taiyuan was renamed again to Taiyuan 10th School.

In 1986, the school was officially  renamed to Shanxi Experimental Secondary School (SESS).

On September 24, 2009, the new campus of SESS high school completed at Jinyang Street, and all of the SESS high school students was moved to the new campus from the campus in northern Taiyuan where they were originally studying. After, the original campus serves only as middle school.

Academic achievements

From 1986 (when the school was renamed to Shanxi Experimental Secondary School), the school has delivered more than one thousand top students to universities in China.

In 2003, student Zhou Yan was awarded Gold Medal in International Chemistry Olympiad. He is also the first Gold Medal owner in Shanxi Province.

In 2008, student Lian Biao was awarded Gold Medal in International Physics Olympiad.

In 2014, student Zhang Yuan scored a total grade of 711 in National Higher Education Entrance Examination (Gaokao) .

Admissions and academics
SESS is considered one of the top preparatory schools in Shanxi Province, and amongst the top three feeder institutions in the province for elite colleges. Today the school is divided into Middle School (7th through 9th grades), and High School (10th through 12th grades). Located by the provincial government complex of Shanxi Province, Shanxi Experimental Secondary School maintains the largest budget among all the high schools in Shanxi Province. It is also the only high school in Shanxi Province directed by the provincial Department of Education other than the municipal

The school is prestigious for selective admission and high quality of education. In recent years, Shanxi Experimental Secondary School has higher average entrance score than any other high school in Shanxi Province in the provincial standard High School Entrance Examination. Annually, the graduates top the National Higher Education Entrance Examination list in the province. Chinese top universities such as Tsinghua University and Peking University hold early admission tests in Shanxi Experimental Secondary School in early spring. Many students from Shanxi Experimental Secondary School are remarkable for the national and international science Olympiad competition awards in Physics, Chemistry, Biology, Computer Science and Mathematics. Today, the school consists with internationalization. A large number of students have pursued study in the post-secondary schools in United States, Canada, the United Kingdom, Australia and other countries.

External links
 Shanxi Experimental Secondary School Official website

Educational institutions established in 1882
High schools in Shanxi
Experimental schools
Buildings and structures in Taiyuan
1882 establishments in China
Education in Taiyuan